"I Don't Give a Fuck"  is a protest song by American rapper 2Pac and the fourth track of his debut  studio album 2Pacalypse Now (1991). The song, which features rapper Pogo, deals overtly with police brutality and racism. In the song, he narrates how the black community in the United States face harassment by racists, including police.

Overview
In the intro, Tupac receives phone calls from one of his friends about the police beating them for no apparent reason and various crimes that are directed at them, after which he starts to rap. The theme of the song is strongly anti-racist and anti-police, and the lyrics tell about racism, such as store owners following him in the store, and crime in the ghetto.

This was one of the songs that a youth in Texas blamed for his shooting of a state trooper, as in the outro of the song, Tupac questions the authority for not dealing with these issues and he curses out the CIA, the FBI, and then president George H. W. Bush in the spoken-word outro of "I Don't Give a Fuck".

He says:

Fuck you to the San Francisco Police Department
Fuck you to the Marin County Sheriff Department [sic]
Fuck you to the FBI
Fuck you to the CIA
Fuck you to the B-u-s-h
Fuck you to the Ameri KKK a
Fuck you to all you redneck prejudice motherfuckers

Media appearances
Tupac mentioned the phrase used for this song later as a major turning-point line in his big screen debut Juice (1992) while in an verbal altercation with "Q" (Omar Epps) in their school hallway.

The song was later sampled by American rapper Eminem in his song, "Just Don't Give a Fuck".

The song appeared in the 2004 video game Grand Theft Auto: San Andreas in the radio station Radio Los Santos, though it was later removed in 2014 due to expired copyright licensing.

References

1991 songs
Tupac Shakur songs
Criticism of police brutality
Songs about police brutality
Songs about police officers
Songs against racism and xenophobia
Songs written by Tupac Shakur